In nuclear physics, resonance escape probability  is the probability that a neutron will slow down from fission energy to thermal energies without being captured by a nuclear resonance. A resonance absorption of a neutron in a nucleus does not produce nuclear fission.

Generally, the higher the neutron energy, the lower the probability of absorption, but for some energies, called resonance energies, the resonance factor is very high. These energies depend on the properties of heavy nuclei. Resonance escape probability is highly determined by the heterogeneous geometry of a reactor, because fast neutrons resulting from fission can leave the fuel and slow to thermal energies in a moderator, skipping over resonance energies before reentering the fuel.

Resonance escape probability appears in the four factor formula and the six factor formula. To compute it, neutron transport theory is used.

References

Literature
 

Nuclear technology
Radioactivity